Eichhoffen is a commune, in the Bas-Rhin department in Alsace in north-eastern France. Eichhoffen station has rail connections to Strasbourg and Sélestat.

Politics and government 
Elected in 2014 and re-elected in 2020, the current mayor of Eichhoffen is Évelyne Lavigne.

Notable residents 

 Mathias Ringmann (1482-1511) — Scholar, cosmographer and poet

See also
 Communes of the Bas-Rhin department

References

Communes of Bas-Rhin
Bas-Rhin communes articles needing translation from French Wikipedia